Central Women's University is one of the first private university in Bangladesh, established in 1993. It was the first university in Bangladesh established exclusively for the purpose of female education. Beggzadi Mahmuda Nasir served as the founding vice-chancellor of the university until 1999.

Following mismanagement on the part of the original governing body, it was one of the eight universities the University Grants Commission of Bangladesh recommended for shutting down due to poor quality of academic standards. The university was also served with show-cause notice by judicial authorities asking why it would not be closed down.

As of August, 2010, the university received legal permission from the court to continue its educational activities under a new governing body and with new academic faculty and expanded academic offerings.

It is the first university in Bangladesh to run all student and staff computers on Linux software.

Academic programs 
Degrees currently offered are:
 Bachelor of Business Administration
 Master of Business Administration
 Executive Master of Business Administration
 Bachelor of Science in Computer Science and Engineering
 Bachelor of Arts in English Literature
 Bachelor of Social Science in Political Science and Governance Studies
 Bachelor of Social Science in Sociology and Gender Studies
 Bachelor of Social Science in Geography and Environmental Studies
 Bachelor of Arts in Journalism and Media Studies

List of vice-chancellors 
 Prof. Dr. Perween Hasan ( present)

References

External links
 Official website
 

 
Private universities in Bangladesh
Educational institutions established in 1993
Women's universities and colleges in Bangladesh
1993 establishments in Bangladesh
Universities and colleges in Dhaka